Matlabganj J. B. High School (MJBHS) also known as Matlabganj J.B. Pilot High School. It is an educational institution of Chandpur (erstwhile Greater Comilla), Bangladesh.

History 
Residents and humanitarians, the late Jagabandhu Saha and the late Biswanath Ghosh, from the Saha Para (community) on the south-east corner of the old campus and the Ghosh Para (community) on the south-west corner respectively, founded the institute in 1917 and therefore the letters J and B in the name of the institute.

Its initial days included the Partition Of British India into West Pakistan, East Pakistan and India; an event that succeeded in spreading disharmony in the subcontinent. Bengal was Partitioned and a population transfer, at the expense of significant human suffering, took place. It also withstood the trying times of Bangladesh Liberation War the formation of Bangladesh replacing the erstwhile East Pakistan.

The nineteen fifties and the sixties became an 'Era of Remarkable Excellence'. The achievements of the high school at that time is a story of hope, in view of what Matlab was then  a rural area inhabited mostly by peasants, fishermen, and small business owners, all tormented by wild monkeys and snakes, and plagued by cholera and typhoid. Talent pool for the school was shallow and finance pool was almost dry.

Dr A Matin Patwari, an MJBHS alumnus secured first position in East Pakistan Board Examinations in 1950.

The school was initially nurtured by MJBHS's Headmaster, the late Waliullah Patwari. Under his guidance and by virtue of the dedication of the staff, the school became a model of educational excellence at that period. The model may sound familiar in modern days. Stunningly, it was developed and implemented six decades ago. In a resource-restricted village school at Matlab. Matlab story is not only of educational excellence, it is of a philosophy of management; of applying psychology and placebo effect in motivating and treating health issues, long before they were discovered and implemented in the Western world; of doing more with less; and of promoting peaceful co-existence. There is a lesson or two in it for all readers: alumni, current and future students, teachers, and educators, at any level and anywhere.

The institute is trying to regain its momentum. The institute celebrated its centenary in the year 2017. The prominence it achieved in its early days despite the humble origins may be an inspiration for the present generation to look up to.

Recognition 
Tapantosh Chakrabarty- MJBHS alumnus (1965), BUET Chemical Engineer, PhD from University of Waterloo, a seven-continent marathon finisher, Innovator and a Columnist from Calgary, Canada wrote about his days at MJBHS for the Daily Observer.

Notable alumni
 Abdul Matin Patwari, Vice-chancellor of Bangladesh University of Engineering and Technology, matriculated in 1950.
 AB Siddique, a drafter of the Constitution of Bangladesh and member of parliament, matriculated in 1943.

References

Further reading
 
 
 
 
 
 
 
 
 
 
 
 

High schools in Bangladesh
1917 establishments in India
Educational institutions established in 1917
Schools in Chandpur District